José Antonio Nebra Mezquita (1672–1748) was a Spanish organist and harpist.

He was the father of José de Nebra. He was also the organist of the Collegiate church of Santa María in Calatayud most likely before 1697.

References

Spanish organists
Male organists
1672 births
1748 deaths
Spanish male musicians